Terry McBride & the Ride is the fourth studio album recorded by American country music band McBride & the Ride. It was released via MCA Records in 1994. This album features a different lineup than other McBride & the Ride albums; it is also the only album they recorded under the name "Terry McBride & the Ride". "Been There", "Somebody Will", and "High Hopes and Empty Pockets" were all released as singles from this album, although none reached Top 40.

"Teardrops" was also released by George Ducas in 1994 as his debut single, and "Somebody Will" by River Road in 1998 as the third single from their self-titled debut album.

Track listing
"Teardrops" (George Ducas, Terry McBride) - 2:59
"I Can't Dance" (Andy Byrd, Jim Robinson) - 3:21
"Been There" (Don Schlitz, Bill Livsey) - 3:28
"I'd Be Lyin'" (McBride, Rick Bowles, Josh Leo) - 3:15
"Somebody Will" (Walt Aldridge, Brad Crisler, Steven Dale Jones) - 2:44
"High Hopes and Empty Pockets" (Byrd, Robinson) - 3:45
"Before I Fall in Love" (Dann Huff, Kurt Howell) - 3:25
"Nothin' Nobody Can Say" (Steve Bogard, Jeff Stevens) - 3:28
"He's Living My Dreams" (Aldridge, McBride) - 3:45
"I'll See You Again Someday" (Tim Mensy, McBride) - 3:53

Personnel
Max Carl – background vocals, keyboards
Chad Cromwell – drums
Bill Cuomo – keyboards
Glen Duncan – fiddle
Rob Hajacos – fiddle
John Hammond – drums, percussion
Dann Huff – electric guitar
Brent Mason – electric guitar
Terry McBride – lead vocals
Gary Morse – steel guitar
Jeffrey Roach – B-3 organ
Timothy B. Schmit – background vocals
Leland Sklar – bass guitar
Harry Stinson – background vocals
Kenny Vaughn – electric guitar
Biff Watson – acoustic guitar

References

1994 albums
MCA Records albums
Albums produced by Josh Leo
McBride & the Ride albums